Sophta is a genus of moths of the subfamily Boletobiinae of the family Erebidae. This genus was erected by Francis Walker in 1863.

Taxonomy
The genus has previously been classified in the subfamily Acontiinae within Noctuidae.

Species
 Sophta adusta Wileman & West, 1929
 Sophta concavata Walker, [1863]
 Sophta hapalopis Turner, 1925
 Sophta poecilota Turner, 1908
 Sophta ruficeps Walker, 1864

References

 Note: This source lists Sophta as a synonym of Laspeyria.

Boletobiinae
Noctuoidea genera